Rangbaaz is an Indian Bengali language action film directed by Raja Chanda and produced under the banner of Surinder Films. The film stars Dev and Koel Mallick in lead roles. It is a remake of the 2007 Telugu film Chirutha, starring Ram Charan Teja and Neha Sharma.

Plot
 
An auto driver, sees Lucky Bhai murder a journalist. The auto driver manages to capture Lucky Bhai and his henchman, and hold them until the Police arrive. Afterwards, the auto driver returns home to his wife and son, Raj. Unfortunately, Lucky Bhai and his henchmen break into their house that night. The auto driver is killed and his wife is severely injured. Raj survives uninjured. Raj's mother is in a critical condition but he and his uncle don't have enough money to pay for her operation. The local mafia leader's son has committed murder and offers Raj a deal. In order to pay for his mother's surgery, Raj has to go to prison for the crime.

Twelve years later, Raj is released from prison. When he meets his uncle again, he finds out that his mother has died. Raj also falls in love with Madhurima who lives with her father. Officer Ajay helps Raj get a passport. Raj plans to go to Bangkok to join a travel agency recommended by his uncle. Madhurima and her friends arrive in Bangkok as tourists. Raj is one of the tour guides. Raj seems to be irritable around Madhurima. Biku and his henchmen are bothering Madhurima. Raj saves Madhurima by attacking Biku and his henchmen. Few days later, Biku & his henchmen see Madhurima again. Charan has to fight Biku & his henchmen again. Raj and Madhurima use a water bike to escape. They get stuck in middle of the sea when their water bike runs out of gas. When Madhurima wakes up, Madhurima sees an island that is little far away. Raj and Madhurima have to swim to the island.

Raj tells Madhurima that he loves her. Madhurima's father and the other people believe that Madhurima is kidnapped by Raj as they find out Raj was in prison for 12 years. He arranges helicopters to search for Madhurima. Raj sees one helicopter in the sky, but Madhurima doesn't want anyone to find them. Madhurima tells Raj that she loves him too and her father would never let her marry Raj. Raj loves Madhurima, but Raj didn't expect Madhurima to fall in love with him. He reveals that he came to Bangkok to kill Lucky Bhai. Raj found out that Lucky Bhai's a notorious international criminal with network in Hong Kong, Bangkok, and other places has shifted base to Bangkok. Raj tells Madhurima that Biku's none other than Lucky Bhai's son. In Bangkok, Raj tried to kill Lucky Bhai at a bar, but Lucky Bhai escaped & Lucky Bhai stopped coming to Bangkok. By the time Raj finishes telling his foiled plot to kill Lucky Bhai, many men in black robes and black suits come and then a fight starts. Just then Madhurima's father comes in a helicopter. Seeing her dad she runs to him and tells him not to hit Raj as he did not kidnap her but saved her. At first Madhurima's father tells to leave him, and the goons leave him, but when Madhurima tells him that she wants him and loves him, her father tells the goons to kill him. The goons hit Raj on the head and he falls down and they go away. Then a member of the company for which Raj works searching for him on a boat finds him and takes him back. A hot argument takes place between Madhurima and her father and she runs away to Raj.

Then Madhurima's father calls Raj and tells him that his mother is still alive. His uncle lied to Charan that his mother died. Madhurima's father will trade Raj's mother for Sanjana. Raj takes Madhurima to a building where he tells her that he is going to trade her for his mother. He tells her that she has her father, but his mother has no one except him. Madhurima's father comes and takes her and gives Raj his mother back who was grateful to him.

Meanwhile, Lucky Bhai sees the pictures of Raj and Madhurima on television, which was the effort of the Madhurima's father to find her, and recognizes Raj as the person who tried to kill him. Lucky Bhai's brother Vicky (Surajit Sen) then kidnaps Madhurima, and Raj goes to rescue Madhurima, in the meantime, Lucky Bhai asks Raj to come and see him, Raj realising that this is the time for revenge, goes to Lucky Bhai.

Lucky Bhai then initially tries to find out as to who Raj is and as to why Raj wants to kill him, but after Raj's unwillingness to reveal the same, Lucky Bhai beats up Raj , and then after Raj insists upon seeing Madhurima, Lucky Bhai asks for Madhurima to be brought, Madhurima is then brought with Vicky ; Raj kills Vicky and then kills all of Lucky Bhai's henchmen, in the meantime, Lucky Bhai tries to kill Madhurima, Raj saves Madhurima in the nick of time. Raj then beats up Lucky Bhai and knocks him to the ground.

Raj and Madhurima come towards each other, and just as it seems like everything is just about finished, Lucky Bhai comes to attack both Madhurima and Raj with a knife, Raj evades the knife and grabs the knife from Lucky Bhai and forces Lucky Bhai to the ground. Raj then tells Lucky Bhai that "Lucky had killed an auto driver 12 years back", and this is when Lucky Bhai realises that Raj is the son of that Auto Driver, Raj then tells Lucky Bhai that his only goal in life was to kill Lucky Bhai and then kills Lucky Bhai in the same way which Lucky Bhai had killed Raj's father.

Note : Although Rangbaaz is a remake of the 2007 Telugu movie "Chirutha", it is not exactly a scene to scene remake, as there is considerably less to almost minimal violence in Rangbaaz while Chirutha was over loaded with violence, there are many more tiny differences in both the movies.

Cast
 Dev as Raj
 Koel Mallick as Madhurima aka Madhu
 Rajatava Dutta as Madhurima's father
 Rahul Dev as Lakshman Mitra aka Lucky Bhai, a dreaded goon (killed)
 Kharaj Mukherjee as Madhu's bodyguard
 Mousumi Saha as Aparna, Raj's mother
 Supriyo Dutta as Police Commissioner Ajay
 Surajit Sen as Vicky
 Priyanka Rati Pal as Madhu's friend
 Partho Sarathi Chakraborty as the friend of Raj
 Biswanath Basu as Bobby, owner of Indo Bangkok Travel Agency
 Kushal Chakraborty as Raj's father (killed)
 Pradip Dhar as Raj's uncle
 Prasun Gain as Sardi

Soundtrack

Jeet Gannguli composed the music for Rangbaaz.

References

Bengali-language Indian films
2010s Bengali-language films
Films set in Bangkok
2013 films
Bengali remakes of Telugu films
Films scored by Jeet Ganguly